"HaSela haAdom" is an Israeli song written by Haim Hefer, with music by Yochanan Zarai, recorded by Arik Lavie in 1958. The song tells the story of a young Israeli soldier who illegally crossed the Israeli-Jordanian border to visit Petra, and ends with the death of its hero. Hefer was inspired by a popular tradition of Israeli youth of hiking to Petra, many of them killed by Jordanian soldiers. The song became so popular among the youth that the government banned it for many years. Hefer's song was familiar to all Israelis, and many authors incorporate it into their books and songs.

Background 

Hiking across the land of Israel started as part of the Zionist movement of youth, especially popular in Palmach. It was seen as a thing sabras, non-immigrant Israelis, should do. They toured the whole new-born country, often going through a desert, along coasts and Egyptian and Jordanian borders. The hikers had a saying, "Next year – Petra", the site was called "the trek of treks". Meir Har-Zion, often called a "mythological army hero", "fulfilled this oath" and travelled to Petra with his girlfriend, Rachel Savorai (also from Palmach), in 1953. Dominik Peters described their trip: "They hitchhiked southwards in Israel, crossed the border, took four bottles of water, some juice, food for two nights and one day, as well as a compass, a map, and a loaded rifle with them [...] Once Meir Har-Zion and Rachel Savorai, the first kovshim ("conquerors") of the sandy and stony soil, returned safe and sound, three men and two women decided after a Palmach reunion to follow their example." After publication of Har-Zion's book, Pirkei Yoman (Chapters of a Diary), such trips became very popular among young Israelis. This first group who decided to reach Petra after Har-Zion and Savorai were Arik Meger, Miriam  Monderer, Eitan Minz, Ya'acov Kleifeld, and  Gila Ben-Akiva. They did not succeed: Minz was bitten by a snake, and when they tried to return to Israel, they were killed by Jordanian soldiers. Later, in 1956, Dror Levi and Dimitri Berman of the 890th Battalion tried to reach Petra; Berman was wounded and Levi was killed. In 1957, six more Israelis were killed when they tried that trek.

Yigal Schwartz writes that in the 1950s "the Red Rock functioned as a magical place on the map of the Israeli national imagination, the product of an ancient civilisation, the secret of whose charm also lay, without a doubt, in the fact that it was a dangerous site".

Song 

Songwriter Haim Hefer was himself a member of Palmach; he "created with his songs a soundtrack for the young state of Israel, 'the karaoke of the 1960s', a 'collective linguistic DNA'". 

The song was very popular, it "glorified the danger of hikes to Petra"; to discourage the youth, David Ben-Gurion banned the song from the radio. As a result, "forbidden song about forbidden city" became even more popular.

Legacy 

Almost all Israelis were familiar with the song, Petra was featured later in many books and songs. Among them is a book by Amos Oz, A Perfect Peace, written in 1982, that tells a story of young kibbutznik dissatisfied with his life, who leaves his wife and home and heads to Petra where "[t]here lay[s] the Land of Edom. The Kingdom of Transjordan. The city half as old as time. The enemy's home." This is a reference to the first stanza of Hefer's song. Another example is a short story by Ruth Almog, titled "Susim" ("Horses"), about a young man, Oscar, who made aliyah with his mother after surviving in the Holocaust. He served in the army, but when he heard about the Petra hike, his sabra-friend told him that "Petra is not for soaps" (soap (Sabon in Hebrew) was a derogatory nickname for immigrant-Israelis who survived the Holocaust).

Another example of the song's legacy is Dana International's song from 1994 album, titled "Nosa'at le-Petra" ("Going to Petra"), written by Yoav Ginai. By incorporating the Petra theme, Dana International—transsexual singer and LGBTQ advocate, winner of the Eurovision Song Contest in 1998—showed that Hefer's words were still known to Israelis; she "criticizes the nationalistic myth, sexualizes it with metaphors not appearing in the original version, and satirizes the nature-loving Palmach language of Haim Hefer, which was in favor of powerful full moons". Dana's song was called a "political-sexual parody": "Dana turns this Ashkenazi Israeli myth, with its implicit sexual imagery of a heroic masculine penetration of a feminized Orient, into an explicit sexual encounter with a desert that she returns to rather than from".

References

External links 
 The song at The National Library of Israel
 Studio version on Youtube
 Live version by Arik Lavie on Youtube
 Live version by Rika Zarai in France, 1972 on Youtube
 Detailed accounts of all Israelis illegal trips to Petra

1958 songs
Censorship of music
Israeli songs
Israeli culture
Songs about cities
Hebrew-language songs